Gurbandha (also written as Gurbanda) is a village in the Gurbandha CD block in the Ghatshila subdivision of the Purbi Singhum district in the Indian state of Jharkhand.

Geography

Location

Area overview
The area shown in the map “forms a part of the Chota Nagpur Plateau and is a hilly upland tract”.  The main rivers draining the district are the Subarnarekha and the Kharkai. The area lying between Jamshedpur and Ghatshila is the main industrial mining zone. The rest of the district is primarily agricultural. In the district, as of 2011,  56.9% of the population lives in the rural areas and a high 43.1% lives in the urban areas.

Note: The map alongside presents some of the notable locations in the district. All places marked in the map are linked in the larger full screen map.

Civic administration
There is a police station at Gurabanda

The headquarters of Gurabandha CD block is located at Gurabandha village.

Demographics
According to the 2011 Census of India, Gurbandha had a total population of 1,312, of which 658 (50%) were males and 654 (50%) were females. Population in the age range 0–6 years was 158. The total number of literate persons in Gurbandha was 771 (66.81% of the population over 6 years).

(*For language details see Gurbandha block#Language and religion)

Education
Government High School Gurabanda is a Hindi-medium coeducational institution established in 1973. It has facilities for teaching from class I to class X. The school has a library with 621 books.

References

Villages in East Singhbhum district